Owen Chirombe (born 30 March 1973), is a Zimbabwean cricket umpire. He first umpired in first-class cricket in 2005, and in 2010 was involved in international cricket for the first time, umpiring a One Day International between Zimbabwe and Ireland.
In January 2023, he was named as one of the three match referees for the 2023 ICC Under-19 Women's T20 World Cup.

See also
 List of One Day International cricket umpires
 List of Twenty20 International cricket umpires

References

1973 births
Living people
Zimbabwean One Day International cricket umpires
Zimbabwean Twenty20 International cricket umpires
Sportspeople from Harare